Beach Pétanque competition at the 2016 Asian Beach Games was held in Da Nang, Vietnam from 25 to 30 September 2016 at Phuong Trang Area.

Medalists

Men

Women

Mixed

Medal table

Results

Men

Shooting
27 September

Qualification round 1

Qualification round 2

Knockout round

Singles

Preliminary
27 September

Knockout round
28 September

Doubles

Preliminary
25 September

Knockout round
26 September

Triples

Preliminary
29 September

Knockout round
30 September

Women

Shooting
27 September

Qualification round 1

Qualification round 2

Knockout round

Singles

Preliminary
27 September

Knockout round
28 September

Doubles

Preliminary
25 September

Knockout round
26 September

Triples

Preliminary
29 September

Knockout round
30 September

Mixed

Doubles

Preliminary
25 September

Knockout round
26 September

References

External links 
Official website

2016 Asian Beach Games events